Opinio was a Dutch weekly magazine which was briefly published between 2007 and 2008. The magazine was headquartered in Amsterdam, the Netherlands.

History
Opinio was first appeared on 18 January 2007. The magazine ceased operations and declared bankruptcy on 3 June 2008. The number of subscribers at that point was 5000, which was not economically sustainable.

The magazine was an initiative of former Trouw editor Jaffe Vink. It appeared in tabloid format (16 pages), and was printed on pink paper. It did not contain any advertisements, nor pictures or editorial cartoons. The magazine described itself as left wing-conservative. The headquarters of the magazine which was published weekly on Fridays was in Amsterdam.

Opinio was largely funded by IT-entrepreneur Roel Pieper. Among its many contributors were Ayaan Hirsi Ali, Paul Cliteur, Afshin Ellian, Derk Jan Eppink and Bart Jan Spruyt and Douglas Murray.

Incidents
In 2008, Dutch prime minister Jan Peter Balkenende started legal proceedings against the magazine due to its claim that Balkanende had described Islam as a problem. He lost the case.

References

2007 establishments in the Netherlands
2008 disestablishments in the Netherlands
Defunct magazines published in the Netherlands
Defunct political magazines
Political magazines published in the Netherlands
Dutch-language magazines
Weekly magazines published in the Netherlands
Magazines established in 2007
Magazines disestablished in 2008
Magazines published in Amsterdam